Edward, Ed or Eddie Murray may refer to:

Ed Murray (baseball) (1895–1970), Major League Baseball player
Ed Murray (Tennessee politician) (1928–2009), speaker of the Tennessee House of Representatives
Ed Murray (Washington politician) (born 1955), former Mayor of Seattle, Washington
Ed Murray (Wyoming politician) (born 1958), Secretary of State of Wyoming
Eddie Murray (born 1956), American Major League Baseball player
Eddie Murray (American football) (born 1956), National Football League player
Eddie Murray (rugby league) (1959–1981), Aboriginal Australian rugby league footballer
Eddie Murray (footballer) (born 1962), English footballer
Edward Murray (colonial administrator) (c.1800–1874), Trinidadian registrar of slaves
Edward P. Murray, American judge

See also
Edwin R. Murray (Ed Murray, born 1960), Democratic politician from Louisiana
Edward Murphy (disambiguation)